Marion von Klot (1897–1919), was a Latvian (Baltic-German) noblewoman.

She was executed during the Russian Bolshevik occupation in Riga in 1919. She became regarded as an evangelical martyr.

References

  Adelheid von Hauff: Hedwig von Redern (1866–1935) in Peter Zimmerling (Hg.): Evangelische Seelsorgerinnen. Biographische Skizzen, Texte und Programme, Vandenhoeck & Ruprecht, Göttingen 2005, ISBN 3-525-62380-1,

1897 births
1919 deaths
20th-century Latvian people
20th-century Latvian women
20th-century Protestant martyrs
Baltic-German people